Niebla (Spanish for fog) is a coastal Chilean town close to the city of Valdivia, Valdivia Province, Los Ríos Region. Niebla is located on the northern edge, at the mouth of the Valdivia River, across from Corral. Niebla's beach and folk market are popular tourist destinations during the summer, together with the ruins of a Spanish colonial fort and its museum.

In 2017 Niebla had a population of 2,989 inhabitants up from 2,202 in 2002.

References

See also
 Valdivian Fort System
 List of towns in Chile

Populated places in Valdivia Province
Beaches of Chile
Populated coastal places in Chile
Landforms of Los Ríos Region
Coasts of Los Ríos Region